Eleothinus is a genus of beetles in the family Cerambycidae, containing the following species:

 Eleothinus abstrusus Bates, 1881
 Eleothinus longulus Bates, 1881
 Eleothinus pygmaeus Bates, 1885

References

Acanthocinini